Harvard Schmidt (September 25, 1935 – April 7, 2020) was an American professional basketball player and coach. A ,  small forward from Kankakee, Illinois. Schmidt attended the University of Illinois at Urbana–Champaign, where he played from 1954–1957 for the men's basketball team.  He also coached the Fighting Illini men's basketball team for seven years from 1967 to 1974.

Schmidt averaged 12.3 points per game for his collegiate career, playing in 65 games. He was selected in the second round (11th pick overall) of the 1957 NBA Draft by the Minneapolis Lakers.
 
Schmidt was appointed by his alma mater on March 29, 1967 to succeed Harry Combes who had been his head coach a decade earlier and was pressured into resigning ten days prior by the university which was threatened with expulsion by the Big Ten Conference over a slush fund scandal. He compiled a record of 89 wins and 77 losses. He died on April 7, 2020 at the age of 83.

Head coaching record

References

1935 births
2020 deaths
Amateur Athletic Union men's basketball players
American men's basketball coaches
American men's basketball players
Basketball coaches from Illinois
Basketball players from Illinois
Illinois Fighting Illini men's basketball coaches
Illinois Fighting Illini men's basketball players
Minneapolis Lakers draft picks
New Mexico Lobos men's basketball coaches
Sportspeople from Kankakee, Illinois
Small forwards